"Bella mia fiamma, addio", K. 528, is a concert aria by Wolfgang Amadeus Mozart for solo soprano and orchestra, composed in Prague in 1787. The aria was published by Breitkopf & Härtel in 1881.

Description 

Sung by the character Titano, the aria is marked andante, then allegro, and consists of 196 bars in the key of C major. The vocal range reaches from D to A with a tessitura of D to G. A typical performance lasts for around ten minutes. The aria contains bravura writing with difficult chromatic passages. The aria part of the work calls for a flute, two oboes, two bassoons, two French horns and strings. The time signature for the introduction is common time , then for the aria proper  triple metre.

History 
Composed in Prague, dated 3 November 1787, the aria was dedicated to its original singer, Josepha Duschek, for whom Mozart previously wrote the aria "Ah, lo previdi", K. 272, in Salzburg. The composition of this aria was somewhat unusual; the following tale is attributed to Mozart's son Karl Thomas:

Librarian Bernard Wilson, commenting on the story, adds: "There seems to be some corroboration of this account in the aria itself. The words Quest' affano, questo passo è terribile per me (mm. 27–34) are set to an awesome tangle of chromatic sequences artfully calculated to test the singer's sense of intonation and powers of interpretation. Apparently Mme. Duschek survived the passo terribile, since the autograph bears her name in Mozart's hand." In 1789, Duschek sang the work along with other arias at concerts given by Mozart in Dresden and Leipzig during his Berlin journey of that year.

Text 

Recitativo
Bella mia fiamma, addio!
Non piacque al cielo di renderci felici.
Ecco reciso, prima d'esser compito,
quel purissimo nodo, che strinsero
fra lor gl'animi nostri con il solo voler.
Vivi: Cedi al destin, cedi al dovere.

Della giurata fede la mia morte t'assolve.
A più degno consorte ... O pene!
unita vivi più lieta e più felice vita.
Ricordati di me, ma non mai turbi
d'un felice sposo la rara
rimembranza il tuo riposo.
Regina, io vado ad ubbidirti
Ah, tutto finisca il mio furor col morir mio.
Cerere, Alfeo, diletta sposa, addio!

Aria
(to Proserpina): Resta, o cara, acerba morte
mi separa, Oh Dio ... da te!

(to Cerere): Prendi cura di sua sorte,
consolarla almen procura.

(to Alfeo): Vado ... ahi lasso!
Addio, addio per sempre.

Quest'affanno, questo passo
è terribile per me.
Ah! Dov'è il tempio, dov'è l'ara?

(To Cerere): Vieni, affretta la vendetta!
Questa vita così amara
più soffribile non è!

(To Proserpina): Oh cara, addio per sempre!
Light of my life farewell!
Heaven has not planned for our happiness.
Those pure strands were snapped
before out knot of happiness could be bound
by our spirit in a single will.
Live, and submit to fate and your duty.

My death absolves you from your promises.
United to a better partner (Oh grief!)
You will have a better, happier life.
Remember me,
but do not be disturbed
by thoughts of unhappy former lover.
My Queen, I leave you
and death will end my ravings.
Ceres, Alpheus, beloved heart, goodbye.

Stay my beloved
A cruel death takes me from you, Oh God!

Look after her
Comfort her.

I go, alas, farewell
farewell forever.

This distressing situation
is hard to bear.
Where is the temple, where is the altar?

Come revenge, be quick
This bitter life
Can be borne no longer.

Goodbye forever!

References

External links
 
 
 Italian and English text
 Notes by Ian Page, 2017
 , Cecilia Bartoli, Concentus Musicus Wien, conductor Nikolaus Harnoncourt
 , Kiri Te Kanawa, Vienna Chamber Orchestra, conductor György Fischer

Arias by Wolfgang Amadeus Mozart
Soprano arias
1787 compositions
Music dedicated to family or friends
Compositions in C major
Ceres (mythology)